The CPA Donald O. Hebb Award for Distinguished Contributions to Psychology as a Science is an annual award presented by the Canadian Psychological Association (CPA).

The Hebb award is presented to an individual who has made a significant contribution to Canadian psychology as a scientific discipline (as a researcher, teacher, theorist, spokesperson, or public policy developer). Recipients are nominated by their peers and selected by a committee of CPA Fellows. The prize was originally named the Award for Distinguished Contributions to Canadian Psychology as a Science when it was presented to its first recipient, Donald O. Hebb, in 1980. The 1986 award was the first to carry Hebb's name in its title.

This award is not to be confused with other awards also named after Hebb. The American Psychological Association's Society for Behavioral Neuroscience and Comparative Psychology (SBNCP) presents the D.O. Hebb Distinguished Scientific Contributions Award for research in behavioral neuroscience and/or comparative psychology. The Canadian Society for Brain, Behaviour and Cognitive Science (CSBBCS) presents the Donald O. Hebb Distinguished Contribution Award for contributions to the science of the brain, behaviour, and cognition.

Recipients

See also

 List of psychology awards
 Canadian Psychological Association
 APA Award for Distinguished Scientific Contributions to Psychology

References 

Psychology awards
Academic awards
Canadian science and technology awards